Lisa Raymond and Rennae Stubbs were the defending champions, but competed this year with different partners.

Stubbs teamed up with Meghann Shaughnessy and lost in quarterfinals to Teryn Ashley and Abigail Spears.

Raymond teamed up with Cara Black and successfully defended her title, by defeating Cho Yoon-jeong and Francesca Schiavone 7–6(7–5), 6–1 in the final.

Seeds

Draw

Draw

References

External links
 Official results archive (ITF)
 Official results archive (WTA)

2003 WTA Tour
Silicon Valley Classic